Yaniella flava is a Gram-negative, aerobic, non-spore-forming and non-motile bacterium from the genus Yaniella which has been isolated from saline soil from the Qinghai Province in China.

References

External links
Type strain of Yaniella flava at BacDive -  the Bacterial Diversity Metadatabase

Micrococcaceae
Bacteria described in 2005